Shinca Entertainment, formerly Shinca Productions, is an American entertainment company in Burbank, California, established in October 2005 by actor and producer Shin Koyamada and his wife, TED Talk speaker and producer Nia Lyte. The company's divisions include Shinca Pictures as the film and television unit, Shinca Comics as the American comic book and manga unit and Shinca Studios as the video game and stickers unit.

History 
In October 2005, Shinca Productions was initially established by Shin Koyamada and Nia Lyte to produce an American television talk show titled The Nia Lyte Show (2005), targeting Hispanic audience in the United States and Latin America. After producing the show in 2006, the company expanded its business to a film production, which was Koyamada's childhood dream to produce an action movie, and later produced an action and drama film titled Good Soil (2007), directed by Craig Shimahara, about Jinbei Masuda, a Japanese Christian of the samurai class, draws his strength from his faith, family, and fencing.

In 2008, Koyamada and Lyte started developing a comic book story with an comic book illustrator and writer Travis Moore, who later illustrated for DC Comics' Freedom Fighters, Justice Society of America, Wonder Woman, Titan, The Green Team, Sword of Sorcery. In 2009, they established a comic book company called Laizen Comics to produce and publish its first American comic book titled The Dreamhoppers (2009), an action adventure about the supernatural powers given to certain people known as Dreamhoppers. These guardians of the Dreamworld can transform their human forms into fantasy characters and enter dreams in order to save one from the evils in the Dreamworld. The Dreamhoppers was distributed to many different comic book stores throughout the United States in 2010.

In 2011, Shinca Pictures established a joint venture called Spirit Show Network with a producer Claudia Hallowell, to produce and distribute television miniseries about fashion, art, music, love and earth. In the first show, they produced Spirit Fashion Show, featuring famous fashion designers such as Sue Wong, Ximena Valero, Mike Vensel, Sarah Nami Ahn, Octavio Carlin, Henry Duarte, Thai Nguyen and others who showcased their fashions at Los Angeles Fashion Week in Los Angeles, California in 2012. In the second show, Spirit Art Show featured many famous and upcoming artists, including Mark Strickland of Los Angeles, Clement Hanami and world-famous artists from Pageant of the Masters of Laguna Beach, California, connecting in depth with the artists, focusing on their unique creative talents, the spirit and soul of their art, and the messages they bring to the world through interviews and showcasing exciting creations in 2013. The third show titled Spirit Music Show is featuring an Emmy Award-winning Music Producer Scott Liggett, a famous music producer Jason Goldman, a film music composer Erich Bulling from Dirty Dancing (1987) and Dirty Dancing: Havana Nights (2004), a singer and WWE wrestler Brandon Gatson and others about connecting in depth with musicians and the people involved in making music in 2013. The forth show is Spirit Love Show, exploring what love is to people of all ages: children, teenagers, adults and people who have been married for over half a century. The fifth show is Spirit Earth Show featuring Mati Waiya from the Chumash Indian tribe, Salomeh Diaz from the Pachamama Alliance, a founder of the Wildlife WayStation Martine Colette, The STAR Eco Station, and Santa Monica Pier Aquarium about how Earth nurtures our spirits and souls and takes care of us and how we can in turn take care of our precious Earth in 2013.

In 2014, Shinca Pictures produced a second film Heart of the Dragon, directed by Jeff McDonald and written by James West from The Proud Family and Moesha, about a personal bodyguard hired by a girl who is pregnant with a supernatural child giving her extraordinary abilities and that he and the girl are connected to ancient prophecies.

As of 2018, Shinca Pictures is developing an animation series based on the comic book The Dreamhoppers. The company is in pre-production of an action comedy feature film titled Ticker, written by Stephen Langford from Family Matters (1994-1995), Malcolm and Eddie (1998-2000), and Saved By The Bell (1992) and starring by Shin Koyamada, about an innocent man is implanted with a bomb, on a race to save his life teamed with an alcoholic LAPD Bomb Squad cop looking to save his career and to possibly save a life in the meantime as well as another action adventure feature film titled Zero, written by the same writer about a secret Japanese intelligence agent goes to Hong Kong for a conference when he witnesses a man murdered by an unmanned car.

Divisions

Shinca Pictures 
Shinca Pictures is a film and television arm of Shinca Entertainment focused on developing and producing action films, television shows, animation and documentary.

The division was first established to produce a television talk show pilot The Nia Lyte Show, hosted by TED Talk speaker Nia Lyte and filmed in both Spanish and English, to target Hispanic audience in 2005. Shinca Pictures has produced two films, which are an action drama film titled Good Soil (2007) about Jinbei Masuda, a Japanese Christian of the samurai class, draws his strength from his faith, family, and fencing and an action thriller film titled Heart of the Dragon (2014) about a personal bodyguard hired by a girl who is pregnant with a supernatural child giving her extraordinary abilities and that he and the girl are connected to ancient prophecies. In 2013 and 2014, Shinca Pictures produced a series of different television shows titled Spirit Fashion Show, Spirit Art Show, Spirit Love Show, Spirit Earth Show and Spirit Music Show for Spirit Show Network, featuring celebrity fashion designers, award-winning music producers and singers, famous portrait artists, Earth activists and over-half-a-century married people. Shinca Pictures is currently focused on developing and producing two different animation series based on the comic book titled The Dreamhoppers (2009), two action feature films and a television series based on a true story.

In 2021, Shinca Pictures has developed and produced an award-winning 2021 drama short film Shadow Glass, directed and written by Jay Lee, a director and writer from Sony's Zombie Strippers.

Shinca Comics 
Shinca Comics is a comic book publishing arm of Shinca Entertainment focused on producing and publishing American comic book and Japanese manga.

In 2009, Laizen Comics, an imprint of Shinca Comics, first produced an original American comic book titled The Dreamhoppers (2009), illustrated and written by Travis Moore from DC Comics and created by Shin Koyamada, Nia Lyte and Travis Moore. The comic book is an action adventures about the supernatural powers given to certain people known as Dreamhoppers. The thousands of printed copies were distributed to various comic book stores throughout the United States and some comic-con events in other countries.

Imprints
Laizen Comics (2009–present)

Shinca Studios 
Shinca Studios is a video game arm of the Shinca Entertainment focused on producing mobile games and console games.

Titles

Awards

References

External links 
 Shinca Entertainment official site

Shinca Entertainment on LinkedIn
Shinca Pictures on IMDb

Film production companies of the United States
Companies based in Burbank, California
American companies established in 2005
Mass media companies established in 2005
Entertainment companies established in 2005
2005 establishments in California